Geary is a given name. Notable people with the name include:

 Geary Eppley (1895–1978), American university administrator, professor, agronomist, military officer, athlete and track and field coach
 Geary Gravel (born 1951), American science fiction author and sign language interpreter
 Geary Hobson (born 1941), Cherokee, Quapaw/Chickasaw scholar, editor and writer of fiction and poetry

See also
Geary (surname)

Masculine given names